Heroes and Villains is a 2007–2008 BBC Television drama series looking at key moments in the lives and reputations of some of the greatest warriors of history. Each hour-long episode features a different historical figure, including Napoleon I of France, Attila the Hun, Spartacus, Hernán Cortés, Richard I of England, and Tokugawa Ieyasu. The statements at the beginning of each episode read: "This film depicts real events and real characters. It is based on the accounts of writers of the time. It has been written with the advice of modern historians." In the United States the show was aired on The Military Channel and was called Warriors.

Production
The series was filmed by BBC Factual department in 720p high definition with the Panasonic DVCPRO HD cameras. The greenscreen scenes were filmed with handheld AG-HVX200 cameras.

Episodes
The numbering of the six episodes that make up the series is debatable due to them being listed differently on different sources. The DVD release has them listed in the order of Spartacus, Attila the Hun, Shogun, Richard the Lionheart, Cortes, and Napoleon; while the BBC website guide has them listed as Napoleon 1/6, Cortes 2/6, Attila the Hun 3/6, Shogun 4/6, Spartacus 5/6, and Richard the Lionheart 6/6. However they are listed here by their airdate according to the BBC website.

Media information

DVD release
The series was released as a two disc set on Region 2 DVD by BBC Video on 24 March 2008. It was marketed and sold in the United States in April 2009 as "Warriors". The USA release included a third disc containing two Edward Bazalgette documentaries, Hannibal and Genghis Khan.

Companion book

References

External links
 

2000s British drama television series
2007 British television series debuts
2008 British television series endings
BBC television dramas
American Heroes Channel original programming
British military television series
Heroes and Villains: Shogun
BBC television documentaries about prehistoric and ancient history
BBC television documentaries about history during the 16th and 17th centuries
BBC television documentaries about history during the 18th and 19th centuries
Television series set in the Pre-Columbian era
Television series set in the Roman Empire